Flesh and Bone is the fifth studio album by singer/songwriter Richard Marx released in 1997 on Capitol Records.

Singles
The single "Until I Find You Again" reached #3 on the Billboard Adult Contemporary chart and peaked at #42 on the Billboard Hot 100 in the spring of 1997.

Critical reception

With a 3 out of 4 stars rating, Richard Paton of the Toledo Blade said "Marx is a longtime poprock hit-maker, but this time around he feels the fire of R&B and offers a disc that has a pop gloss but resonates with more soul than we have heard from him." Sandra Schulman of the Sun Sentinel declared "Dependable, smooth pop-rock with poetic lyrics sung in a well-meaning way is, has been and always will be Marx's style. Other nice, ready-for-video tracks on Flesh and Bone are the midtempo dance number Fool's Game and the touchy subject matter of You Never Take Me Dancing." With a 3 out of 5 stars rating, Stephen Thomas Erlewine of Allmusic exclaimed "Flesh & Bone is an improvement from Paid Vacation, mainly because Marx "isn't trying as hard to be contemporary". Erwine said that Marx "accepted, more or less, that he isn't fighting for a position in the Top 40 and has resigned himself to the adult contemporary charts". "While that means Flesh & Blood doesn't even rock as hard as, say, "Don't Mean Nothin'," it does mean that is pleasantly and inoffensively melodic, with more memorable moments than its predecessor", he added.

Fred Shuster of the Los Angeles Daily News gave a 3 out of 5 stars rating and wrote "You know Richard Marx - the forgotten Marx brother, the shallow, musical one called Nauseo. It was a surprise, then, to discover Marx's new R&B-drenched effort, "Flesh and Bone" (Capitol), is his most likable and modern-sounding to date. From the subtle trip-hop touches of the strong opener, "Fool's Game"; to the funky Earth, Wind & Fire tribute, "You Never Take Me Dancing"; and the modern soul of "Breathless"; Marx as producer and artist hits the bull's-eye."

Track listing
All songs written by Richard Marx, except where noted.
 "Fool's Game" – 6:25
 "You Never Take Me Dancing" – 5:39
 "Touch of Heaven" – 4:51
 "What's the Story" – 5:04
 "Can't Lie to My Heart" – 6:29
 "Until I Find You Again" – 4:24
 "My Confession" – 5:08
 "Surrender To Me" – 3:41
 "Eternity" – 5:23
 "What's Wrong with That" (Marx, Fee Waybill) – 4:40
 "The Image" (Marx, Waybill) – 4:21
 "Too Shy To Say" – 3:19
 "Talk To Ya Later" (David Foster, Steve Lukather, The Tubes) – 4:22
 "Breathless" – 5:48
 "Angel's Lullaby" – 3:59
 "Miracle" – 4:20

Japanese bonus tracks
"Every Day Of Your Life (Duet with ASKA)" – 4:40
"Too Shy To Say" – 3:20
"Every Day Of Your Life (solo version)" – 4:40

Charts

Albums

Singles

Personnel 
 Richard Marx – lead vocals, backing vocals (1-5, 7-12), keyboards (1, 6, 7, 8, 11), digital piano (1), synth kalimba (2), acoustic guitar (5), acoustic piano (12)
 Greg Phillinganes – keyboards (2), Rhodes (5, 11)
 John Lehmkuhl – synthesizer programming (3)
 Tom Keane – Rhodes (4)
 Simon Franglen – Synclavier programming (6), keyboard programming (6–8), keyboards (7, 8), drum programming (7, 8)
 Jamey Jaz – synthesizer programming (9)
 Matt Rollings – Hammond B3 organ (10)
 David Innis – keyboards (12)
 Bruce Gaitsch – guitar (1, 2, 5, 9-12), acoustic guitar (5), nylon string guitar and solo (6)
 Michael Landau – guitar (3, 4)
 Michael Thompson – guitar (6–8)
 Steve Lukather - guitar (13)
 Randy Jackson – electric bass (1, 4, 5, 9-12), synthesizer programming (3)
 John Pierce - electric bass (13)
 Herman Matthews – drums (2, 12)
 Jonathan Moffett – drums (4, 5, 9–11)
 Simon Phillips - drums (13)
 Chris Trujillo – percussion (5)
 Kim Wilson – harmonica (4)
 Marc Russo – saxophone (11, 12)
 Horns on "What's Wrong With That" – Lee Thornburg and Steve Grove
 Horns on "The Image" – Jerry Hey, Gary Grant, Charley Loper and Marc Russo; Arranged by Dick and Richard Marx
 Strings on "Fool's Game" and "Can't Lie to My Heart" – Israel Baker, Charles Veal Jr., Murray Adler, Bernard Kundell, Gail Tricia Cruz-Farkas, Bette Byers, Henry Ferber, James Getzoff, Ezra Kliger, Farhad Behroozi, Carole Mukogawa, Cynthia Morrow, Milton Thomas, David Shamban, Daniel Smith and Waldemar DeAlmida; Arranged and conducted by Dick Marx
 Backing vocals – Maurice White (2), Cindy Mizell (2, 4, 10), Paulette McWilliams (2, 4, 10), Luther Vandross (4, 5), Nita Whitaker (6), Bob Bowker (7, 8), Jeff Morrow (8), Tony Ransom (8), Steve Grissette (8), Fee Waybill (9)
 Co-Lead vocals – Gorgeous Blonde (6), Fee Waybill (8)

Production 
 Arranged by Richard Marx (all tracks), Randy Jackson (track 3), Michael Landau (track 4) and Jamey Jaz (track 9).
 All songs produced by Richard Marx; "Touch of Heaven" produced by Richard Marx and Randy Jackson; Lead Vocal on "Until I Find You Again" produced by Gorgeous Blonde; Lead Vocal on "Eternity" produced by Fee Waybill.
 Recording Engineers – Bill Drescher, David Cole, David Whittman, Bruce Gaitsch, Craig Bauer, Greg Droman, Richard Flack, Jess Sutcliffe, Claude Achille and Allen Abrahamson.
 Assistant Engineers – Larry Schalit, Douglas Bamford, Pat Karamian, Mike Douglas, Alex Reed, Bryan Carrigan, Gil Morales, Leslie Ann Jones, Jennifer Wyler, Andrew Page, Mike Tacci and Scott Steiner.
 All songs mixed by Bill Drescher, except "Touch of Heaven" mixed by David Cole.
 Mastered "with care" by Wally Traugott

Recording Studios
 The Record Plant, A&M Studios, Conway Studios, Frantic Studios, Johnny Yuma, Music Grinder, Enterprise Studios, L.D.S. in Westlake Studios (all in Los Angeles) 
 Sony Studios (NYC)
 Battery Studios (London)
 Quad Studios (Nashville)
 Hinge Studios (Chicago)

References

1997 albums
Albums produced by Richard Marx
Richard Marx albums
Capitol Records albums